Steve Renko, Jr. (born December 10, 1944) is a former right-handed pitcher in Major League Baseball. He played for the Montreal Expos (1969–1976), Chicago Cubs (1976–1977), Chicago White Sox (1977), Oakland Athletics (1978), Boston Red Sox (1979–1980), California Angels (1981–1982) and Kansas City Royals (1983).

Career
Renko attended the University of Kansas where he played baseball, basketball and American football.

Renko was a 24 year old minor league pitcher for the New York Mets when he was traded to the Montreal Expos in 1969. It was the Expos inaugural year in Major League Baseball while the Mets became the 1969 World Series champions. Renko pitched for the Expos during their first seven seasons (1969-1975) leading the team in wins in 1973 with 15 victories. For his career, Renko ranks in the top five of all Expos pitchers with 68 career victories for the team. 

He helped the Angels win the 1982 American League Western Division, with a win/loss of 11-6.

He was a 15-game winner in 1971 and 1973.

He led the National League in earned runs allowed (115) in 1971.

He led the National League in wild pitches (19) in 1974.

He ranks 99th on the career home runs allowed List (248).

In 15 seasons he had a 134-146 win-loss record, 451 games, 365 games started, 57 complete games, 9 shutouts, 36 games finished, 6 saves, 2,494 innings pitched, 2,438 hits allowed, 1,233 runs allowed, 1,107 earned runs allowed, 248 home runs allowed, 1,010 walks allowed, 1,455 strikeouts, 22 hit batsmen, 73 wild pitches, 10,704 batters faced, 86 intentional walks, 4 balks and a 3.99 earned run average. In 1979, he carried a no-hitter into the ninth inning against the Oakland A's in Oakland, only to be broken up by a Rickey Henderson double with one out in the bottom of the ninth.  Renko pitched 3 career one-hitters.

As a hitter, Renko was above average for a pitcher, posting a .215 batting average (114-for-531) with 44 runs, 6 home runs, 42 RBI, 3 stolen bases and 25 bases on balls.

References

External links

1944 births
Living people
Sportspeople from Kansas City, Kansas
American expatriate baseball players in Canada
Major League Baseball pitchers
Montreal Expos players
Chicago Cubs players
Chicago White Sox players
Oakland Athletics players
Boston Red Sox players
California Angels players
Kansas City Royals players
Baseball players from Kansas
Kansas Jayhawks baseball players
Auburn Mets players
Williamsport Mets players
Memphis Blues players
Jacksonville Suns players
Tidewater Tides players
Kansas Jayhawks football players
Kansas Jayhawks men's basketball players
American football quarterbacks
Players of American football from Kansas
Basketball players from Kansas
American men's basketball players